Antioch University Los Angeles (AULA) is a campus of Antioch University in Culver City, California.

Background
Antioch College was founded in Yellow Springs, Ohio. Horace Mann, Antioch College’s first president's goal was to create an educational environment that was stimulating and unconventional in its approach to learning.

Antioch evolved from a small liberal arts college to a multi-campus university system with five campuses located across the nation in Yellow Springs, Ohio, Keene, New Hampshire, Seattle, Washington, Santa Barbara, California and Los Angeles, California.  The Antioch University system and Antioch College are no longer affiliated in any way.

History
Antioch University Los Angeles is one of the five campuses of Antioch University.  The seeds of the modern Antioch University were sown in the birth of an independent, non-sectarian college founded in 1852 and then created in 1964 with the founding of the Putney School of Education in New England, the first of its present campuses.

Antioch University was originally a single campus college, Antioch College, and was the result of American educator Horace Mann's dream to establish a college comparable to Harvard but with some notable differences. This college was to be completely non-sectarian and co-educational, and with a curriculum that would not only include the traditional treatment of the classics, but would emphasize science and the scientific method, history and modern literature. Students would not compete for grades, but would be encouraged to pursue issues of interest to them, read what they considered worthwhile and present papers on topics of their own choosing. Founded in 1852 as Antioch College in Yellow Springs, Ohio, Horace Mann became the first president in 1853.

From its inception, racial and gender equality, independent study and independent thinking were integral parts of Antioch College. Six students were accepted for the first quarter: four men and two women who came to share the same college classrooms for the first time in the U.S. The notion of gender equality extended also to the faculty. Antioch was the first U.S. college to designate a woman as full professor, and the original faculty included seven men and two women. Then, in 1863, the college instituted the policy that no applicant was to be rejected on the basis of race.

While Antioch College never diverged from the philosophy of Horace Mann, the final form of an Antioch education traced its roots from the election of Arthur Morgan as President of the college in 1920. Morgan, like Mann, believed in the development of the individual as a whole. Having seen the difficulty encountered by ivory-tower academicians attempting to participate in the business world, he resolved to change the cloistered educational experience by providing students with work experience in their field. He wrote “The Plan for the New Antioch” which was his vision for the future of the school. This was the beginning of Antioch's unique program of work and study, what Morgan termed, “industrial education.”

Morgan initiated the practice of student government. He also changed the nature of the admissions procedure. Rather than relying on entrance examinations, Morgan opted for more personal information on prospective students. In addition, senior exams were graded "honors" or "pass", and students who failed could retake the exam. Morgan remained at Antioch until 1933, when President Roosevelt requested that he assume directorship of the Tennessee Valley Authority Project.

Antioch University Los Angeles was established in 1972, with just 12 students.

The campus is located in Culver City, within the Greater Los Angeles area, approximately where the 405 and 90 freeways cross. There are currently about 1,200 students enrolled.

Academics 
The University offers undergraduate degree completion programs in Liberal Studies, Applied Studies, Applied Arts and Media, Urban Communities and Justice, and Applied Technology and Business Leadership, and graduate programs in Nonprofit Management, Education and Teacher Credentialing, Psychology, Creative Writing, and Urban Sustainability. Antioch University is accredited by the Higher Learning Commission (HLC).

Social support 
The Bridge Program offers a year of humanities education for college credit at no cost to students. It provides free university classes for adults who have not have otherwise has access to higher education including tuition, textbooks, instruction, tutoring, transportation, and meals during class for all Bridge students. The program, formerly called the CHE Program (Community Humanities Education) began in 1999 and was founded by David Tripp and Shari Foos. The Bridge Program was inspired by the Clemente Course at Bard College, which similarly provided free classes to economically disadvantaged students who might not otherwise be able to attend college. 
The low-residency Master of Arts in Urban Sustainability Program is training the next generation of urban problem-solvers to meet the world’s dual challenges of climate change and inequality. Graduates are leading the public and private sector making positive change.
The Horace Mann Upstanders Award, sponsored by the Education Department, honors work that promotes social action in children’s literature.
AULA’s graduate-level LGBT Psychology Specialization (the first of its kind) founded Colors LGBTQ Youth Counseling Center. Colors provides free lesbian, gay, bisexual and transgender-affirmative counseling to young adults. The LGBT Specialization was featured in an article in the NY Times on the need for LGBT psychology.
The low-residency Master of Fine Arts in Creative Writing, which requires the inclusion of social justice in students’ work, is repeatedly ranked in the top 10 in the nation by Poets & Writers magazine. The MFA Program's Poetry Genre and was featured on PBS NewsHour.

References

Los Angeles
Educational institutions established in 1972
Schools accredited by the Western Association of Schools and Colleges
Universities and colleges in Los Angeles County, California
1972 establishments in California
Private universities and colleges in California